Red Rover was the name of two clipper ships.

Red Rover, opium clipper 
Red Rover, built in 1829, was a 254-ton clipper "built, owned, and operated" by Captain William Clifton which was "one of the fastest" opium clippers running between Calcutta and Lintin in the 1830s. Red Rover was modeled after an American War of 1812 blockade runner, Prince de Neufchatel, and was "the first clipper to sail to Canton against the wind."

The well-known firm of Jardine, Matheson & Co. held shares in the ship beginning in 1832.

Red Rover, California clipper 

A second clipper named Red Rover, active in the California trade, was built by Fernald & Pettigrew in 1852.
Between January 22 - May 2, 1854, the ship sailed from New York to San Francisco in 120 (122) days. The Seaman's Bride and Winged Racer which left New York one respectively two days after the Red Rover arrived at San Francisco on May 23.

Red Rover was damaged in the December 26–27, 1853 fire which destroyed the clipper Great Republic.

Later, the ship served in the guano trade, sailing "from Baker's Island with a cargo of guano to Hampton Roads in 99 days," between August 28 - December 5, 1860.

References 

  Extensive mention of Red Rover 's career.

Opium clippers
1830 ships
1852 ships